Vysokaya Gora is the name of several rural localities in Russia:
Vysokaya Gora, Arkhangelsk Oblast, a village in Rovdinsky Selsoviet of Shenkursky District of Arkhangelsk Oblast
Vysokaya Gora, Kaluga Oblast, a village in Baryatinsky District of Kaluga Oblast
Vysokaya Gora, Kirov Oblast, a village in Ust-Lyuginsky Rural Okrug of Vyatskopolyansky District of Kirov Oblast
Vysokaya Gora, Komi Republic, a village in Ust-Tsilma Selo Administrative Territory of Ust-Tsilemsky District of the Komi Republic
Vysokaya Gora, Novgorod Oblast, a village in Polnovskoye Settlement of Demyansky District of Novgorod Oblast
Vysokaya Gora, Pskov Oblast, a village in Opochetsky District of Pskov Oblast
Vysokaya Gora, Republic of Tatarstan, a selo in Vysokogorsky District of the Republic of Tatarstan
Vysokaya Gora, Vologda Oblast, a village in Vizmensky Selsoviet of Belozersky District of Vologda Oblast

See also
zheleznodorozhnoy stantsii Vysokaya Gora, a settlement in Vysokogorsky District of the Republic of Tatarstan
203 Hill